Events in the year 2017 in Bolivia.

Incumbents
 President: Evo Morales
 Vice President: Álvaro García Linera

Events
4 November – Katherine Añazgo of Bolivia finishes as 4th runner-up in the Reina Hispanoamericana 2017 pageant.

Sport
Bolivia at the 2017 World Championships in Athletics
Continuing from 2016 – the 2016–17 Liga de Fútbol Profesional Boliviano season

Deaths
 

23 February – Óscar Salas Moya, politician and trade unionist (b. 1936).
27 July – Ovidio Messa, footballer (b. 1952).
16 August – Roger Pinto Molina, politician (b. 1960).
17 November – Óscar Zamora Medinaceli, politician (b. 1934).

References

 
2010s in Bolivia
Years of the 21st century in Bolivia
Bolivia
Bolivia